Michael Julius "Mickey" McLaney (1 February 1915 - 9 September 1994) was a mafia-linked US golf and tennis player who made a fortune in the casino business.

Career

Michael Julius McLaney was born on February 1 of 1915 in Louisiana. McLaney made a fortune in the Casino business.

His career began as a state champion tennis player for eight years running, and in 1962 he won the Grass Court Men's Doubles title at the United States Amateur Championships, with Gardnar Mulloy. McLaney also played excellent golf, declining to turn professional on the grounds that he could make more money as an amateur (he claimed to have once won $250,000 from Carroll Rosenbloom betting on a round of golf). McLaney formed a professional partnership with Rosenbloom, and was in Rosenbloom's owner's box with him at the Colts-Giants 1958 NFL Championship Game.

In September 1958 McLaney was able to purchase a large share of the Casino Internacional at Havana's Hotel Nacional de Cuba, while partnering with Rosenbloom and ultimately purchasing all shares. In 1959, following the Cuban Revolution, the hotel and casino were nationalised, and McLaney briefly imprisoned.

Michael J. McLaney's life was documented in the book 'Bobby And J. Edgar' written by Burton Hersh. According to this book, after he is released from Cuba's prisons, McLaney flees to the City of Miami, Florida where he immediately gets together to scheme with associates to plan to firebomb the huge Cuban oil refineries once owned by Esso, Shell Oil Company and Texaco which is planned to take place at the very time as April 1961 Bay of Pigs invasion takes place.

According to Burton Hersh, the FBI learns of this scheme and quickly alerts the 64th U.S. Attorney General, Robert F. Kennedy of this attack. RFK takes off for Florida and interrupts a key meeting of McLaney and his associates on a houseboat where RFK confronts McLaney; according to witnesses, RFK drives his forefinger into McLaney's chest and tells him that there will not be any bombing of these oil refineries because the three oil companies hope to someday recover these former assets in Cuba.

However, this incident did not seriously affect McLaney's relationship with the Kennedy brothers according to Burton Hersh. On December 29, 1962, after the 35th U.S. President, John F. Kennedy, had given a speech in Miami, Florida's Orange Bowl Game stadium before about 50,000 attendees who came to honor the just released from Cuba Bay of Pigs Invasion survivors, JFK frequently visited McLaney's  40 million dollar villa in Miami Beach.

McLaney continued to be active in the Casino and Hotel business, moving to the Bahamas and operating a casino in the Cat Cays. In the 1967 Bahamas election McLaney aided Lynden Pindling, and was mentioned in a February 3, 1967 issue of Life magazine article alleging corrupt connections between Pindling and organised crime. McLaney successfully sued the magazine's publisher, Time Inc.

Michael Julius McLaney moved with his family to Haiti, where he enjoyed a near-monopoly on the Casino business under the Duvaliers.

References

1915 births
1994 deaths
20th-century American businesspeople
American casino industry businesspeople
Sportspeople from New Orleans
Tennis people from Louisiana